There are several high schools named Clovis in the United States, including:

Clovis High School (California), Clovis, California
Clovis High School (New Mexico), Clovis, New Mexico